Lars Larsen (born 8 December 1951) is a Danish former professional footballer who played as a defender. He spent his entire career at Boldklubben Frem, making 514 appearances in which he scored 94 goals.

Club career
Larsen made his first-team debut for Boldklubben Frem on 20 September 1970 against Akademisk Boldklub (AB). He played almost 20 years for the club, making his last appearance on 30 October 1988 away against Helsingør IF.

International career
Larsen earned 22 international caps for the Denmark national football team, a tally which could have been higher if it had not been for his fear of flying. He made his debut for Denmark on 3 June 1974 at Københavns Idrætspark against rivals Sweden, with his direct opponent being striker Ralf Edström. Denmark lost 2–0.

Personal life
After his career, Larsen worked at Kommunedata and BRFKredit. He lives in Hvidovre with his wife Sanne. Together they have 3 children. He currently works in electronic data processing for SDC.

References

External links
 
 Lars Larsen at Boldklubben Frem (archived)

1951 births
Living people
Danish men's footballers
Denmark international footballers
Boldklubben Frem players
Association football defenders
Footballers from Copenhagen